Fog City Mavericks is a 2007 American documentary film directed by Gary Leva. It chronicles the San Francisco Bay Area's most well known filmmakers through interviews and archival footage. It is narrated by Peter Coyote, who is also featured in the film.

The documentary also covers some of the movies made by these filmmakers such as American Graffiti, Star Wars, Indiana Jones, Apocalypse Now, The Godfather, The Black Stallion, Home Alone, Mrs. Doubtfire, and Toy Story.

Artists, producers and directors featured in the film 
 George Lucas
 Brad Bird
 Clint Eastwood
 Bruce Conner
 Francis Ford Coppola
 Carroll Ballard
 Philip Kaufman
 Saul Zaentz
 John Korty
 Chris Columbus
 Steven Spielberg
 Cash Peters provides the voice of Charlie Chaplin.

Release 
The film premiered at San Francisco's Castro Theater on April 29, 2007. George Lucas and John Lasseter attended as guest speakers.

References

External links 
 Fog City Mavericks on Vimeo
 San Francisco Chronicle Article

American documentary films
Documentary films about the cinema of the United States
2007 films
Documentary films about San Francisco
2000s English-language films
2000s American films